Gravel & Gold is the tenth studio album by American country music singer Dierks Bentley. It was released February 24, 2023, through Capitol Records Nashville.

Content
"Gold" was released on August 8, 2022, as the album's first single. An article by MusicRow confirmed that the project would include contributions from Ashley McBryde, Billy Strings, as well as bluegrass music artists Sam Bush, Jerry Douglas, Charlie Worsham, and Bryan Sutton.

Commercial performance
Gravel & Gold debuted at No. 14 on Billboards Top Country Albums and No. 73 on the US Billboard 200, with 12,000 album-equivalent units.

Critical reception
Stephen Thomas Erlewine of AllMusic wrote, "Throughout the record, Bentley sounds relaxed and cozy in his comfort zone, and that sense of ease, when combined with the occasional barn burner, such as the jocular bluegrass closer 'High Note'[...]is a recipe for a good time."

Track listing

Charts

References

2023 albums 
Albums produced by Ross Copperman 
Albums produced by Jon Randall
Capitol Records Nashville albums
Dierks Bentley albums